François-Isidore de Ricard (23 May 1779 – 26 May 1849) was a French politician. Ricard was an MP for Gard.

External links 
 Biographical details on the National Assembly's site

1779 births
1849 deaths
People from Gard
Politicians from Occitania (administrative region)
Orléanists
Members of the Chamber of Deputies of the Bourbon Restoration
Members of the 1st Chamber of Deputies of the July Monarchy
Members of the Chamber of Peers of the July Monarchy